Frederik, Crown Prince of Denmark, Count of Monpezat,  (Frederik André Henrik Christian; born 26 May 1968) is the heir apparent to the Danish throne. He is the elder son of Queen Margrethe II and Prince Henrik.

Early life

Crown Prince Frederik was born by emergency C-section at Rigshospitalet the Copenhagen University Hospital in Copenhagen, on 26 May 1968 at 23:50 to the then Princess Margrethe, oldest daughter of Frederick IX and heir presumptive to the Danish throne, and Prince Henrik. At the time of his birth, his maternal grandfather was on the throne of Denmark and his matrilineal great-grandfather was on the throne of Sweden.

He was christened on 24 June 1968, at Holmen Church, in Copenhagen. He was named Frederik for his maternal grandfather, King Frederick IX, continuing the Danish royal tradition of the heir apparent being named either Frederick or Christian. His middle names honour his paternal grandfather, André de Laborde de Monpezat; his father, Prince Henrik; and his maternal great-grandfather, Christian X. Frederik's godparents were his maternal aunt, the Queen of the Hellenes; his paternal uncle, Count Etienne de Laborde de Monpezat; his extended relatives, Prince Georg of Denmark and Grand Duchess Joséphine-Charlotte of Luxembourg; and friends of his parents, Baron Christian de Watteville-Berckheim and Birgitta Juel Hillingsø.

He became Crown Prince of Denmark when his mother ascended to the throne as Margrethe II on 14 January 1972. Crown prince Frederik's only sibling is the younger Prince Joachim of Denmark.

Education and career
Frederik attended primary school at Krebs' Skole during the years 1974–1981, from 1974 to 1976 as a private pupil at Amalienborg Palace, and from the third form at Krebs' Skole. In the period 1982–1983, he was a boarder at École des Roches in Normandy, France. In 1986, Frederik graduated from the upper secondary school of Øregaard Gymnasium. In addition to Danish, he is fluent in French (his father's language), English, and German.

In 1986 he began a course in Political Science at Aarhus University. This included a year at Harvard University (1992–1993) under the name of Frederik Henriksen, studying political science. He then took up a position for three months with the Danish UN mission in New York in 1994. In 1995, he obtained his MSc degree in political science from Aarhus University. He completed the course in the prescribed number of years with an exam result above average, thus becoming the first royal to obtain a master's degree. His final paper was an analysis on the foreign policy of the Baltic States, which he had visited several times during his studies. The prince was posted as First Secretary to the Danish Embassy in Paris from October 1998 to October 1999.

Military career

Frederik has completed extensive military studies and training in all three services, notably completing the education as frogman in the naval elite special operations forces Frømandskorpset.

In the period 2001 and 2002, he completed further training for leaders at the Royal Danish Defence College. Frederik remains active in the defence services, and in the period 2002–2003 served as a staff officer at Defence Command Denmark, and from 2003 as a senior lecturer with the Institute of Strategy at the Royal Danish Defence College.

 The Royal Life Guard 1986.
 Lieutenant in the Reserve (Army) 1988.
 Reconnaissance Platoon Commander with the Royal Guard Hussars' Regiment 1988.
 First Lieutenant in the Reserve (Army) 1989.
 Royal Danish Navy Frømandskorpset 1995.
 First Lieutenant in the Reserve (Navy) 1995.
 Captain in the Reserve (Army) 1997.
 Lieutenant Commander in the Reserve (Navy) 1997.
 Royal Danish Air Force Flying School 2000
 Captain in the Reserve (Air Force) 2000.
 Command and General Staff Course, Royal Danish Defence College 2001–2002.
 Commander (Navy) and Major (Army, Air Force) 2002.
 Staff Officer, Defence Command Denmark 2002–2003.
 Senior lecturer with the Institute of Strategy at the Royal Danish Defence College, 2003–.
 Commander, senior grade (Navy), lieutenant colonel (Air force, Army) 2004.
 Captain (Navy), Colonel (Air Force, Army) 2010.
 Rear Admiral (Navy), Major General (Air Force, Army) 2015.

Marriage and children

During a Council of State on 8 October 2003, Queen Margrethe gave her consent to the marriage of Crown Prince Frederik to Mary Elizabeth Donaldson, an Australian marketing consultant whom the prince had met while attending the Sydney Olympics in 2000. Their wedding took place on 14 May 2004 at Copenhagen Cathedral, Copenhagen.

The couple have four children: Christian (born 15 October 2005), Isabella (born 21 April 2007) and twins Vincent and Josephine (born 8 January 2011).

Areas of interest

Scientific research, climate change and sustainability

Frederik has a special interest in scientific research, climate change and sustainability. He was interviewed by Financial Times and CNN International, in the Future Cities program, for their commitment to sustainability. He participated in expeditions, forums and events on climate. The prince has represented Denmark as a promoter of sustainable Danish energy. The prince was one of the authors of the Polartokt Kongelig (Polar Cruise Royal), about the challenges of climate, published in 2009 with a preface written by Kofi Annan. In 2010, wrote the book's foreword Naturen og klimaændringerne i Nordøstgrønland (The nature and climate change in Greenland). Supports scientific research projects, as a patron, as expeditionary, with regular attendance at events and through his foundation, Kronprins Frederiks Fond.

Sports and health

The prince encourages Danish participation in sports. He is a patron and honorary member of various sports organizations, and a member of the International Olympic Committee. He also promotes an active lifestyle in society.

Frederik is an avid sportsman, running marathons in Copenhagen, New York and Paris, and completing the 42 kilometers with a respectable time of 3 hours, 22 minutes and 50 seconds in the Copenhagen Marathon. In 2013, he completed the KMD Ironman Copenhagen in the time of 10:45:32 and is the first royal person to complete an Ironman.

Frederik is a keen sailor, being a competitive Farr 40 skipper as well as an accomplished Dragon boater. He won victories and was a leader in the steps championships. He finished in fourth place in the European Championship Dragon Class 2003 (with 51 boats participating), and at number 4 in the Farr 40 Worlds 2008 (with 33 boats participating). He was the first in his class boat in Fyn Cup 2010 in Denmark, and at number 4 in the Dragon DM 2011 (with 25 boats participating).

In 2016, in lieu of the Olympics in Rio, Frederik told press that he did not regret not chasing his dream to compete in the Olympics after meeting his wife. He had always thought about training and competing, but that would have required him to limit his activities and concentrate on training, instead he put his energy into other aspects of life. In October 2016, Frederik had to cancel his appearance at the royal reception for the Danish Olympic and Paralympic athletes after he fractured his spine while jumping on a trampoline with his eldest son.

Frederik also took part in the relay event during the 2019 IAAF World Cross Country Championships in Aarhus in March 2019.

Fredrik also competes in cross-country skiing, and has skied the Vasaloppet with Norway's Crown Prince Haakon.

Royal Run

In celebration of his 50th birthday, on 21 May 2018, Frederik initiated a public running event across the five biggest cities in Denmark called "Royal Run" with more than 70.000 participants including Frederik and his own family. The event was generally deemed as "exceeding expectations" by the public.

The event has since become annual and was continued in 2019 and 2021. The 2020 version was cancelled due to the COVID-19 situation in Denmark.

Crown Prince Frederik's Foundation
The purpose of the foundation is to provide financial assistance to students of social policy and sciences, for one year's study at Harvard. and provide financial support for scientific expeditions, particularly to foreign parts of the world, including Greenland and the Faeroe Islands and sports purposes, including those with a particularly social aspect.

Participation in expeditions
The Crown Prince participated in an expedition to Mongolia in 1986. In 2000, the Crown Prince participated in "Expedition Sirius 2000", which was a four-month and 2,795 km dog-sledge expedition in the northern part of Greenland. The expedition Sirius marked the 50-year anniversary of the Sirius Patrol. Prince Frederik was part of the polar expedition as a film photographer, whose job was to ensure an optimal coverage of this event.

International Olympic Committee

On 9 October 2009, Crown Prince Frederik was elected a member of the International Olympic Committee, replacing former Danish member Kaj Holm, who had reached the age of retirement. The Crown Prince's candidature was met with some skepticism in Denmark, as it would mean that the Crown Prince would be on a semi-political committee along with several people who are suspected or even convicted of criminal acts. Another concern was whether or not the Crown Prince's loyalty would be towards his country and government, as the Danish constitution prescribes, or with the International Olympic Committee, as is sworn upon election to the committee. The Crown Prince was given special observer status in National Olympic Committee and Sports Confederation of Denmark, as a way to allow him to work, without having political power.

Frederik announced that his point of focus and reason for joining the International Olympic Committee is to promote an active lifestyle among youth. He was elected for an eight-year term, and made it clear that he would terminate his membership upon ascending the Danish throne.

In 2012, Frederik carried the Olympic flame through Notting Hill, a neighbourhood in West London.

In 2016, Frederik faced criticism for voting against Danish Minister for Culture Bertel Haarder and a majority in the Danish Parliament's wishes on the subject of whether or not Russia should be allowed to compete at the 2016 Summer Olympics following allegations of state-sponsored doping.

On 19 June 2017, the Crown Prince announced that he would continue another term of 8 years. However, in 2021, Frederik was announced that he would step down as an active member of the International Olympic Committee at the committee's annual session prior to the 2020 Summer Olympics, citing a wish to intensify his everyday work as the reason for stepping down in the middle of his term.

Titles, styles, honours and arms

Titles and styles
 24 June 1968 – 14 January 1972: His Royal Highness Prince Frederik of Denmark
 14 January 1972 – 29 April 2008: His Royal Highness The Crown Prince of Denmark
 29 April 2008 – present: His Royal Highness The Crown Prince of Denmark, Count of Monpezat

His official title in Danish is Hans Kongelige Højhed Kronprins Frederik af Danmark, Greve af Monpezat (His Royal Highness Crown Prince Frederik of Denmark, Count of Monpezat).

Honours

The Crown Prince has received a number of honours.

National honours
:
 Knight of the Order of the Elephant (R.E.)
 Knight Grand Commander of the Order of the Dannebrog (S.Kmd)
 Recipient of the Cross of Honour of the Order of the Dannebrog (D.Ht.)
 Recipient of the Royal Medal of Recompense, 1st Class
 Recipient of the Naval Long Service Medal
 Recipient of the Homeguard Medal of Merit
 Recipient of the Medal of Honour of the Reserve Officers League
 Recipient of the Military Athletic Medal of Honour
 Recipient of the 50th Anniversary Medal of the arrival of Queen Ingrid to Denmark
 Recipient of the 50th Birthday Medal of Queen Margrethe II
 Recipient of the Silver Anniversary Medal of Queen Margrethe II and Prince Henrik
 Recipient of the Silver Jubilee Medal of Queen Margrethe II
 Recipient of the 100th Anniversary Medal of the Birth of King Frederick IX
 Recipient of the Queen Ingrid Commemorative Medal
 Recipient of the 75th Birthday Medal of Prince Henrik
 Recipient of the 350th Anniversary Medal of the Royal Danish Life Guards
 Recipient of the 70th Birthday Medal of Queen Margrethe II
 Recipient of the Ruby Jubilee Medal of Queen Margrethe II
 Recipient of the 400th Anniversary Medal of the Guard Hussar Regiment
 Recipient of the 75th Birthday Medal of Queen Margrethe II
 Recipient of the Golden Anniversary Medal of Queen Margrethe II and Prince Henrik
 Recipient of the Prince Henrik's Commemorative Medal
 Recipient of the 80th Birthday Medal of Queen Margrethe II
 Recipient of the Golden Jubilee Medal of Queen Margrethe II
: Recipient of the Nersornaat Medal for Meritorious Service, 1st Class

Foreign honours
: 
 Grand Cordon of the Order of Leopold
: 
 Grand Cross of the Order of the Southern Cross
 Grand Cross of the Order of Rio Branco
: 
 1st Class of the Order of the Balkan Mountains
: 
 Grand Cross of the Order of Merit
: 
 Grand Cross of the Order of the Cross of Terra Mariana
: 
 Grand Cross of the Order of the White Rose
: 
 Grand Cross of the Order of National Merit
: 
 Grand Cross 1st Class of the Order of Merit of the Federal Republic of Germany
: 
 Grand Cross of the Order of Honour
: 
 Grand Cross of the Order of the Falcon
: 
 Grand Cross of the Order of Merit of the Italian Republic
: 
 Grand Cordon of the Supreme Order of the Chrysanthemum
: 
 Grand Cordon of the Supreme Order of the Renaissance
: 
 Commander Grand Cross of the Order of the Three Stars
: 
 Knight Grand Cross of the Order of Adolphe of Nassau
 Nepalese Royal Family: 
 Member of the Royal Order of Ojaswi Rajanya
:
 Sash of Special Category of the Order of the Aztec Eagle
: 
 Knight Grand Cross of the Order of the Netherlands Lion
 Recipient of the King Willem-Alexander Inauguration Medal
: 
 Knight Grand Cross of the Order of Saint Olav
:
 Grand Cross of the Order of the Star of Romania
: 
 Knight of the Royal Order of the Seraphim
 Recipient of the 70th Birthday Badge Medal of King Carl XVI Gustaf
: 
 Knight Grand Cordon of the Order of Chula Chom Klao

Symbols of Crown Prince Frederik

Ancestry

See also 
 List of current heirs apparent

Notes

References

Citations

Bibliography

External links

 Biography on the official website of the Danish royal family

|-

1968 births
Living people
Crown Princes of Denmark
Danish princes
Counts of Monpezat
International Olympic Committee members
Aarhus University alumni

Grand Commanders of the Order of the Dannebrog
Recipients of Nersornaat
Recipients of the Cross of Honour of the Order of the Dannebrog
Recipients of the Medal of Merit (Denmark)

Knights Grand Cross of the Order of the Falcon
Knights Grand Cross of the Order of Chula Chom Klao
Grand Crosses of the Order of Honour (Greece)
Grand Crosses Special Class of the Order of Merit of the Federal Republic of Germany
Grand Crosses of the Order of the Star of Romania
Recipients of the Order of the Cross of Terra Mariana, 1st Class
Danish people of French descent
Danish people of Swedish descent
Danish people of German descent
Danish people of British descent
Heirs apparent
Sons of monarchs